Steve Allen Heiden (born September 21, 1976) is an American football coach and former player who is the tight ends coach for the Detroit Lions of the National Football League (NFL).

Playing career

College
Heiden played college football for South Dakota State University and totaled 112 receptions for 1,499 yards (13.4 avg.) and 8 touchdowns. He majored in early childhood education at South Dakota State University.

National Football League

San Diego Chargers
Heiden was selected by the San Diego Chargers in the third round (69th overall) in the 1999 NFL Draft. In his rookie year, he made 11 appearances for the Chargers and made his NFL debut versus the Seattle Seahawks on October 17.

In his second season with the Chargers, he made 15 appearances with three starts. He also caught his first NFL touchdown in a game versus the Carolina Panthers on December 17.

For the first time in his professional career, Heiden appeared in all 16 regular season and made ten starts.

Cleveland Browns
On August 31, 2002, San Diego traded Heiden to the Cleveland Browns. He again appeared in all 16 regular season games and made his Browns debut versus the Kansas City Chiefs on September 8.

In 2003, despite missing the final seven league games because of an ankle injury, Heiden had a career-high season with 18 receptions for 134 yards.

2004 was an excellent season for Heiden with 28 receptions for 287 yards and five touchdowns. His three touchdowns in the game at the Cincinnati Bengals on November 28  were a career-high.

The following season in 2005 was equally as productive for Heiden, who surpassed his previous seasons catch and yardage totals. He made 43 receptions for 401 yards and three touchdowns.

In 2006, he made 16 appearances with six starts. His numbers for the season were good with 36 receptions for 244 yards and two touchdowns. On April 14, 2007, Heiden was signed to a four-year contract extension by the Browns. On November 18, 2009 the Browns placed Heiden on injured reserve with an ankle injury after the Monday Night Football game.

Besides kicker Phil Dawson, Heiden had played for the Browns longer than any other player on the team.

On March 12, 2010, Heiden was released by the Browns.  In June 2011 he retired due to neck spurs. He did not want to retire, but felt his life was at risk.

Coaching career

Arizona Cardinals
On February 5, 2013, Heiden was hired by the Arizona Cardinals as their assistant special teams and assistant tight ends coach. In 2018, he was named assistant offensive line coach.

Detroit Lions
On February 2, 2023, Heiden was hired by the Detroit Lions as their tight ends coach.

References

External links

 Arizona Cardinals bio

1976 births
Living people
American football tight ends
Arizona Cardinals coaches
San Diego Chargers players
Cleveland Browns players
South Dakota State Jackrabbits football players
People from Rushford, Minnesota
Players of American football from Minnesota